Clathrina cribrata is a species of calcareous sponge in the family Clathrinidae. The holotype was collected from Kristiansund, Norway.

Description
Clathrina cribrata is a massive species with its body formed from a network of large, irregular tubes. Some of these extend above the main body of the sponge as blind tubes and others are open-ended, serving as osculi. This sponge contains only one type of calcareous spicule. These are three-rayed spicules, known as triactines, and are distributed throughout the tissues in an unorganized way.

References

Clathrina
Animals described in 2001
Fauna of Norway